Sultan Ashour 10 (in Arabic: السّلطان عاشور العاشر, As-Sulṭān ‘Āshūr al-‘Āshir) is an Algerian television series, directed by Djafar Gacem and broadcast by Echorouk TV for the two first seasons and ENTV for the third season.

Series overview

Cast

Main
  as Sultan Ashour 10 in the first and second season and Hakim Zelloum in the third one
  as Minister Qandil
 Naamoun Madani as Bourhan
  as Sultana Razane 
  as Princess Abla
 Nadia Kounda as Manina
 Kamal Abdatt as King Mokranus
 Othmane Ben Daoud as King Dahmanuse
 Mohammed Yabdri as General Fares
 Blaha Ben Ziane as Nouri
 Kawther El Bardi as Nouria
 Ahmed zitouni as Prince Lokmane
 Mohamed Mrad as Djawed in the 1st and 2nd season and Zakaria Kerouat in the 3rd one
 Nadia Alahoum as Morjana
 Taous Claire Khazem as Maria
 Tir El Hadi as Baji
 Azzeddine Bouchaib as Belouta
 Merouane Guerouabi as El Hachemi
 Ahmed Meddah as Cheddad

Plot

Season 1
Before he died, the "Sultan Boualem" decided to select his successor from his two children: the "El amir Kamel" and the "El amir Ashour". Finally, he chooses "Ashour", which provokes the anger of "Kamel" who decides to leave the kingdom, and after several years of governance by "Sultan Ashour", the kingdom takes its name and becomes "Kingdom Ashouriya"

Season 2
Ashour Tenth discovers in the second part that his brother Kamal, who Ashour had been waiting for 40 years, was killed by Al-Baji who threatened to kill his daughter by the "minister Qandil". However, he was buried in the grave of his father, Boualam IX, so a lamp that installed Ashour Sultan was because Kamal was not yielding to his demands like Ashour, and Kamal fled that night and the minister met him as a lamp. There was no solution for the prince except to strike him with a sword, as a result of this his eyes were wounded. After a long time, Prince Kamal returned to his wife and son. One day, Al-Baji and his men killed him, accompanied by his wife, but he pitied his young son, who is Jawad, who is the legitimate authority. When Alman Ashour did this, Minister Kandil was imprisoned and granted to Jawad the authority when he returned from death, that is, the plot that the minister laid for him, but Jawad did not take the authority to his pity on Ashour, proving to him that he was the authority of everyone on condition To marry him to his cousin, Princess Abla, whom Bniban is asking to marry, so he gave it to her.

Season 3

Production

Setup 
At a time when low prices have affected the economic life of the country, Algerian TV has revised its expenditures for Ramadan 2015. He refused to spend the 14 billion centimes requested by the director Jafar Qasim. After that, Echorouk TV covered his financial expenses, as he earned more than 18 billion centimeters. Introduction from the mobile operator Ooredoo (14 billion centimeters), and Cevital The text took 8 months to complete, accompanied by three books.

Photography 
Filming of a series started in January 2015 and continued for 3 months. "The crew faced many difficulties due to the cold and the rain," according to Saleh Uqrout, the lead actor in the series.

See also

 Echorouk TV
 Bouzid Days

External links
 Official Website
 Facebook Official Page
 twitter

2015 Algerian television series debuts
Algerian television series
2010s Algerian television series
Echorouk TV original programming